Stadio Selvapiana is a multi-use stadium in Campobasso, Italy.  It is currently used mostly for football matches and is the home ground of AC Campobasso.  The stadium holds 18,000 people and was built in 1985.

Selvapiana